Taposiris Magna is a city established by Pharaoh Ptolemy II Philadelphus between 280 and 270 BC. The name means "great tomb of Osiris", which Plutarch identifies with an Egyptian temple in the city.

After Alexander the Great conquered Egypt in 332 BC and established Alexandria, the city of Taposiris Magna became a center for religious festival of Khoiak. The Ptolemaic Kingdom, the last Egyptian dynasty, was established following this, as a Greek state during this Hellenistic Period that lasted until the death of Cleopatra VII in 30 BC.  Napoleon arrived in Egypt during 1798 and French scientists subsequently conducted a survey of the architecture of the city published in the Description de l'Égypte

In the twentieth century, excavations of the site were started under the Italian, Evaristo Breccia. Callisthenes states that Alexander the Great visited the city on his way to Siwa Oasis, which gives credence to the theory that there must have been a town there in the Hellenistic period.

Role in trade 

The city stood on the navigable arm of the now dried-out bed of the ancient Lake Mariout. The size of the lake raises the possibility that the harbor played a role in the trade between Egypt and Libya. Traders from the west could use water transportation to the harbor and then take a caravan route. Similarly, trade from Libya could be shipped aboard boats to Taposiris and transported to interior cities of Egypt, however this theory has its critics. The wine produced in this part of Egypt was famous during this ancient time.

The temple and the tower 

Atop the Taenia ridge, an outcropping of limestone that separates the sea from Lake Maerotis, stand two ancient monuments that were partly restored in the 1930s. One is a tower that has been used as a guide in the reconstruction of the lighthouse of Alexandria and the other is the remains of a temple of Osiris that is believed to be the last resting place of Cleopatra.

In the most scholarly study of the tower conducted by 1974, it was concluded that "The Tower of Abusir" was definitely not a lighthouse nor even a watchtower. It probably was constructed during the Ptolemaic reign after the Pharos lighthouse was built and was only a funerary monument.

Other nearby structures 

Both private and public buildings have been found in the neighborhood along with cisterns and churches. The necropolis shows a variety of burial styles from sarcophagi or pyramids to columns or pilasters. This ancient settlement was occupied from the second century BC to the seventh century AD.

In 2022, a tunnel beneath this ancient Egyptian temple was discovered at a depth of 20 metres. The tunnel is 2 metres high and 1,305 metres long and it transported water to thousands of people. It is an exact replica of the Tunnel of Eupalinos in Greece that also transported water.

Recent excavations 
Various archaeologists have been working on the site since 1998. In 2010, archaeologists discovered a huge granite statue of a Ptolemaic king that was headless and the original gate to a temple dedicated to the god Osiris. The statue is crafted following the traditional ancient representation of an Egyptian king wearing a collar and a kilt. According to Dr. Zahi Hawass the monumental sculpture could represent the Hellenistic-era pharaoh Ptolemy IV, who constructed the Taposiris Magna temple. The team also found limestone foundation stones that would have lined the entrance to the temple. One of these stones bears evidence indicating that the entrance was lined with a series of Sphinx statues similar to those of the pharaonic era. 

A necropolis containing many Greco-Roman style mummies was discovered behind the temple. Hawass said that early investigations revealed that these mummies were buried with their faces turned toward the temple and he noted that this suggested that the temple likely contained the burial of a significant royal personality, possibly Cleopatra VII.

The expedition, started in 2002 as a self-funded expedition led by a Dominican lawyer, Kathleen Martínez. She has found 27 tombs, 20 of which are shaped like vaulted sarcophagi, partly underground and partly aboveground. The remaining seven consist of staircases leading to simple burial chambers. Inside these tombs, her team found a total of 10 mummies, 2 of them gilded. The discovery of this cemetery indicates that an important person, likely of royal status, could be buried inside the temple. The style of the newly discovered tombs indicates that they were constructed during the Greco-Roman period. Martinez states that the expedition has excavated a temple at Taposiris Magna dedicated to the goddess Isis and has discovered coins depicting the face of Alexander the Great. They have found a number of deep shafts inside the temple, three of which seem to have been used for burials. It is possible that these shafts were the tombs of important people. The team leaders believe that Cleopatra and Mark Antony could have been buried in a deep shaft similar to those already discovered inside the temple.

Martinez said that the expedition found a beautiful head of Cleopatra, along with 22 coins bearing her image. The statue and coins show her as a beauty, contradicting a suggestion by an English museum curator that she was not attractive. These finds from Taposiris demonstrate a distinct attractiveness. Contradicting another advanced theory, the features of the sculpted head show no characteristics that would suggest sub-Saharan ancestry. The team also found many amulets, along with a beautiful headless statue dating to the Ptolemaic Period. Among the most interesting finds is a unique mask depicting a man with a cleft chin, which bears some similarity to known portraits of Mark Antony.

A radar survey of the temple of Taposiris Magna, west of Alexandria, Egypt, had been completed earlier in 2002 as part of the search for the tomb of Cleopatra and Mark Antony. The Supreme Council of Antiquities (SCA) expedition excavating the temple and its surrounding area was headed by Zahi Hawass, then secretary general of the SCA, and Kathleen Martinez, the scholar from the Dominican Republic.

In 2012, it was discovered that the ruins had been affected by the Second Battle of El Alamein. The team had found several unexploded bombs as well as charred remains of Italian and New Zealand soldiers within its tunnels. As of 2013, the excavation had been halted, but Martinez was later given permission to continue her work on the site.

In a 2015 television documentary called "Cleopatra's Lost Tomb" (shown October, Channel 4 in the UK), Martinez said that she was sure that they were close to finding the tomb there, possibly in a corner of the site where two likely tombs deep underground had been discovered. It was hoped that work to investigate the likely tombs would commence when the official digging season opened in 2016.

On 21 June 2020, Science Channel released a two-hour documentary entitled "Cleopatra: Sex, Lies, and Secrets" to reveal recent discoveries.

In January 2021, Egyptian-Dominican researchers led by Kathleen Martínez announced the discovery of 2,000-year-old ancient tombs with golden tongues dating to the Greek and Roman periods. Her team also unearthed gold leaf amulets in the form of tongues placed for speaking with the deity Osiris in the afterlife. The mummies were depicted in different forms: one was wearing a crown, decorated with the horns of the deity Hathor and the image of the cobra snake who represents the deity Wadjet at the forehead; the other mummy was depicted with gilded decorations representing a wide necklace.

In 2022, it was reported that a 1,305-meter water-transport tunnel dating to the Ptolemaic period was found 20 meters below ground.

References 

Archaeological sites in Egypt
Cities in ancient Egypt
Cleopatra